The 1989 Spanish Grand Prix was a Formula One motor race held at Jerez on 1 October 1989. It was the fourteenth race of the 1989 Formula One World Championship.

The 73-lap race was won from pole position by Ayrton Senna, driving a McLaren-Honda. Gerhard Berger was second in a Ferrari, while Senna's teammate and Drivers' Championship rival Alain Prost was third.

With Nigel Mansell banned from the race and fined $50,000 following his disqualification and collision with Senna in Portugal the previous week, Ferrari entered only one car for Berger. Senna's win kept the Drivers' Championship alive, but Prost's result meant that the Brazilian had to win both remaining races in order to beat the Frenchman to the title.

Qualifying

Pre-qualifying report
Osella topped a pre-qualifying session for the first time this season as Nicola Larini was fastest by four tenths of a second, ahead of Onyx driver JJ Lehto. Larini's team-mate Piercarlo Ghinzani was third, only the second time in 1989 he had progressed to the main qualifying sessions. The fourth pre-qualifier was the Larrousse-Lola of Philippe Alliot.

Gabriele Tarquini was fifth in his AGS, his sixth successive failure to pre-qualify. Stefan Johansson was down in sixth in the other Onyx after an engine failure, failing to pre-qualify after his podium achievement at the previous race. Roberto Moreno was seventh in the Coloni, with the other Larrousse-Lola of Michele Alboreto down in eighth, his lowest placing thus far. The usual suspects were in the lower positions, with ninth-placed Bernd Schneider notching up his thirteenth consecutive failure to pre-qualify in the Zakspeed, followed by Yannick Dalmas in the other AGS. Schneider's team-mate Aguri Suzuki was eleventh, his fourteenth failure, ahead of Oscar Larrauri's EuroBrun. Bottom of the timings was Enrico Bertaggia in the second Coloni, over two seconds behind his team-mate Moreno.

Pre-qualifying classification

Qualifying report
Ayrton Senna blasted around the 4.218 km (2.6209 mi) Jerez circuit in 1:20.291 to take his pole position record to 40. Gerhard Berger was second in his Ferrari 640, only 0.274 seconds behind the man who would be his  teammate at McLaren. Over a second behind Senna in third was world championship leader Alain Prost in his McLaren, with the surprise of late season qualifying, Pierluigi Martini, fourth in his Minardi, the Pirelli qualifying tyres once again coming to the fore. Martini had been an incredible second fastest after Friday qualifying, only 0.388 slower than Senna.

Philippe Alliot snared a career best fifth place on the grid in his Larrousse, proving that both the Lola chassis and the Lamborghini V12 designed by Mauro Forghieri was starting to come good. It also enhanced Alliot's reputation as a demon qualifier.

Williams-Renault entered two different model cars for their drivers Thierry Boutsen and Riccardo Patrese. Boutsen qualified 21st the new Williams FW13 that had debuted in Portugal, while Patrese reverted to the older model FW12C and ended up sixth on the grid ahead his former Brabham teammate Nelson Piquet in a surprisingly fast Lotus.

René Arnoux (Ligier) and the Rial pair of Pierre-Henri Raphanel and Gregor Foitek all failed to qualify for the race.

Qualifying classification

Race

Race report
McLaren's reigning World Champion Ayrton Senna took the pole, set the fastest race lap and kept the world championship alive with his sixth win of the season. Second with his third podium finish in a row following his second in Italy and his win in the previous race in Portugal was the Ferrari 640 of Gerhard Berger.

Rounding out the points were the 'find of the season' Jean Alesi in his Tyrrell in fourth, the older model Williams-Renault of Patrese in fifth in what would be the FW12C's final race, and giving the Lamborghini V12 its first ever points finish in Formula One was Alliot in what would be the best drive of his Grand Prix career.

Prost's third place gave him a 16-point lead over Senna with only two races to go. If he was to retain his title, the Brazilian would need to win in both Japan and Australia.

Race classification

Championship standings after the race

Drivers' Championship standings

Constructors' Championship standings

 Note: Only the top five positions are included for both sets of standings.

References

Spanish Grand Prix
Spanish Grand Prix
Grand Prix